The candela ( or ; symbol: cd) is the unit of luminous intensity in the International System of Units (SI). It measures luminous power per unit solid angle emitted by a light source in a particular direction. Luminous intensity is analogous to radiant intensity, but instead of simply adding up the contributions of every wavelength of light in the source's spectrum, the contribution of each wavelength is weighted by the standard luminosity function (a model of the sensitivity of the human eye to different wavelengths). A common wax candle emits light with a luminous intensity of roughly one candela. If emission in some directions is blocked by an opaque barrier, the emission would still be approximately one candela in the directions that are not obscured.

The word candela is Latin for candle. The old name "candle" is still sometimes used, as in foot-candle and the modern definition of candlepower.

Definition
The 26th General Conference on Weights and Measures (CGPM) redefined the candela in 2018. The new definition, which took effect on 20 May 2019, is:

Explanation

The frequency chosen is in the visible spectrum near green, corresponding to a wavelength of about 555 nanometres. The human eye, when adapted for bright conditions, is most sensitive near this frequency. Under these conditions, photopic vision dominates the visual perception of our eyes over the scotopic vision. At other frequencies, more radiant intensity is required to achieve the same luminous intensity, according to the frequency response of the human eye. The luminous intensity for light of a particular wavelength λ is given by

If more than one wavelength is present (as is usually the case), one must integrate over the spectrum of wavelengths to get the total luminous intensity.

Examples
A common candle emits light with roughly 1 cd luminous intensity. 
A 25 W compact fluorescent light bulb puts out around 1700 lumens; if that light is radiated equally in all directions (i.e. over 4 steradians), it will have an intensity of 
Focused into a 20° beam (0.095 steradians), the same light bulb would have an intensity of around 18,000 cd within the beam.

History
Prior to 1948, various standards for luminous intensity were in use in a number of countries. These were typically based on the brightness of the flame from a "standard candle" of defined composition, or the brightness of an incandescent filament of specific design. One of the best-known of these was the English standard of candlepower. One candlepower was the light produced by a pure spermaceti candle weighing one sixth of a pound and burning at a rate of 120 grains per hour. Germany, Austria and Scandinavia used the Hefnerkerze, a unit based on the output of a Hefner lamp.

It became clear that a better-defined unit was needed. Jules Violle had proposed a standard based on the light emitted by 1 cm2 of platinum at its melting point (or freezing point), calling this the Violle. The light intensity was due to the Planck radiator (a black body) effect, and was thus independent of the construction of the device. This made it easy for anyone to measure the standard, as high-purity platinum was widely available and easily prepared.

The Commission Internationale de l'Éclairage (International Commission on Illumination) and the CIPM proposed a "new candle" based on this basic concept. However, the value of the new unit was chosen to make it similar to the earlier unit candlepower by dividing the Violle by 60. The decision was promulgated by the CIPM in 1946:
The value of the new candle is such that the brightness of the full radiator at the temperature of solidification of platinum is 60 new candles per square centimetre.

It was then ratified in 1948 by the 9th CGPM which adopted a new name for this unit, the candela. In 1967 the 13th CGPM removed the term "new candle" and gave an amended version of the candela definition, specifying the atmospheric pressure applied to the freezing platinum:
The candela is the luminous intensity, in the perpendicular direction, of a surface of  square metre of a black body at the temperature of freezing platinum under a pressure of  newtons per square metre.

In 1979, because of the difficulties in realizing a Planck radiator at high temperatures and the new possibilities offered by radiometry, the 16th CGPM adopted a new definition of the candela:

The candela is the luminous intensity, in a given direction, of a source that emits monochromatic radiation of frequency  and that has a radiant intensity in that direction of  watt per steradian.

The definition describes how to produce a light source that (by definition) emits one candela, but does not specify the luminosity function for weighting radiation at other frequencies.  Such a source could then be used to calibrate instruments designed to measure luminous intensity with reference to a specified luminosity function. An appendix to the SI Brochure makes it clear that the luminosity function is not uniquely specified, but must be selected to fully define the candela.

The arbitrary (1/683) term was chosen so that the new definition would precisely match the old definition. Although the candela is now defined in terms of the second (an SI base unit) and the watt (a derived SI unit), the candela remains a base unit of the SI system, by definition.

The 26th CGPM approved the modern definition of the candela in 2018 as part of the 2019 redefinition of SI base units, which redefined the SI base units in terms of fundamental physical constants.

SI photometric light units

Relationships between luminous intensity, luminous flux, and illuminance
If a source emits a known luminous intensity Iv (in candelas) in a well-defined cone, the total luminous flux Φv in lumens is given by
Φv = Iv 2 [1 − cos(A/2)],

where A is the radiation angle of the lamp—the full vertex angle of the emission cone. For example, a lamp that emits 590 cd with a radiation angle of 40° emits about 224 lumens. See MR16 for emission angles of some common lamps.

If the source emits light uniformly in all directions, the flux can be found by multiplying the intensity by 4: a uniform 1 candela source emits 12.6 lumens.

For the purpose of measuring illumination, the candela is not a practical unit, as it only applies to idealized point light sources, each approximated by a source small compared to the distance from which its luminous radiation is measured, also assuming that it is done so in the absence of other light sources. What gets directly measured by a light meter is incident light on a sensor of finite area, i.e. illuminance in lm/m2 (lux). However, if designing illumination from many point light sources, like light bulbs, of known approximate omnidirectionally uniform intensities, the contributions to illuminance from incoherent light being additive, it is mathematically estimated as follows. If ri is the position of the ith source of uniform intensity Ii, and â is the unit vector normal to the illuminated elemental opaque area dA being measured, and provided that all light sources lie in the same half-space divided by the plane of this area,

In the case of a single point light source of intensity Iv, at a distance r and normally incident, this reduces to

SI multiples
Like other SI units, the candela can also be modified by adding a metric prefix that multiplies it by a power of 10, for example millicandela (mcd) for 10−3 candela.

References

SI base units
Units of luminous intensity